Lulham (also Romanized as Lūlhām; also known as Golhām  and Lolhām) is a village in Nazlu-e Shomali Rural District, Nazlu District, Urmia County, West Azerbaijan Province, Iran. At the 2006 census, its population was 182, in 50 families.

References 

Populated places in Urmia County